Ladislaus Jagiello (alternately spelled Władysław Jagiełło, Vladislav Jagellonský, or similar) may refer to:

 Jogaila (c. 1362-1434), Grand Duke of Lithuania and founder of the dynasty, later King of Poland as Władysław II Jagiełło
 Władysław III of Poland (1424–1444), son of Władysław II Jagiełło of Poland 
 Vladislaus II of Hungary (1456–1516), grandson of Władysław II Jagiełło and son of Casimir IV Jagiellon

See also
 Jagiellon dynasty, royal dynasty originating from the Lithuanian House of Gediminas dynasty that reigned in Central European countries 14th-16th centuries
 Ladislaus (disambiguation) (For others (not Jagello) named Ladislas or Vladislas)
 Wladislaus II of Poland (disambiguation)
 Ladislaus II (disambiguation)
 Ladislaus III (disambiguation)